Jorge Manuel da Cunha Ribeiro (born 24 January 1993 in Guimarães) aka Jorginho, is a Portuguese footballer who plays for C.D. Aves as a midfielder.

Football career
On 18 May 2013, Jorginho made his professional debut with Aves in a 2012–13 Segunda Liga match against Marítimo B, when he replaced Nuno Binaia (75th minute).

References

External links

Stats and profile at LPFP 

1993 births
Living people
Portuguese footballers
Association football midfielders
Liga Portugal 2 players
C.D. Aves players
Sportspeople from Guimarães